Linus Tornblad (born 2 July 1993) is a Swedish footballer who plays for Utsiktens BK as a forward.

References

External links

1993 births
Living people
Association football forwards
GAIS players
Ljungskile SK players
Åtvidabergs FF players
Norrby IF players
Örgryte IS players
Utsiktens BK players
Allsvenskan players
Superettan players
Swedish footballers